Admiral of the Fleet George Anson, 1st Baron Anson,  (23 April 1697 – 6 June 1762) was a Royal Navy officer. Anson served as a junior officer during the War of the Spanish Succession and then saw active service against Spain at the Battle of Cape Passaro during the War of the Quadruple Alliance. He then undertook a circumnavigation of the globe during the War of Jenkins' Ear. Anson commanded the fleet that defeated the French Admiral de la Jonquière at the First Battle of Cape Finisterre during the War of the Austrian Succession.

Anson went on to be First Lord of the Admiralty during the Seven Years' War. Among his reforms were the removal of corrupt defence contractors, improved medical care, submitting a revision of the Articles of War to Parliament to tighten discipline throughout the Navy, uniforms for commissioned officers, the transfer of the Marines from Army to Navy authority, and a system for rating ships according to their number of guns.

Family and early career
Anson was the son of William Anson of Shugborough in Staffordshire and Isabella Carrier, whose brother-in-law was the Earl of Macclesfield and Lord Chancellor, a relationship that proved very useful to the future admiral. He was born on 23 April 1697, at Shugborough Manor. He was one of eight surviving children of the couple, and the younger brother of Thomas Anson.

In February 1712, amid the War of the Spanish Succession, Anson entered the navy at the age of 15. He served as a volunteer aboard the fourth-rate , before transferring to the third-rate .

Promoted to lieutenant on 17 March 1716, he was assigned to the fourth-rate  in service as part of a Baltic Sea fleet commanded by Admiral John Norris. Anson transferred to the aging fourth-rate  in March 1718, and saw active service against Spain at the Battle of Cape Passaro in August 1718 during the War of the Quadruple Alliance. He then transferred to the second-rate , flagship of Admiral George Byng, in October 1719.

Anson was promoted to commander in June 1722 and given command of the small 8-gun HMS Weazel. Anson's orders were to suppress smuggling between Britain and Holland, a task he swiftly and effectively performed. In recognition of his efforts he was promoted to the rank of post-captain in February 1723 and given command of the 32-gun sixth-rate HMS Scarborough with orders to escort British merchant convoys from the Carolinas. (The Ansonborough district of Charleston, South Carolina, still commemorates his time there.)

He transferred to the command of the sixth-rate HMS Garland, still on the Carolinas station, in July 1728, then to the command of the fifth-rate HMS Diamond in the Channel Fleet in 1730, and to the command of the sixth-rate HMS Squirrel back on the Carolinas station in 1731. He was given command of the 60-gun third-rate  in the West Africa Squadron in 1737 and, having been promoted to commodore with his broad pennant in HMS Centurion, he took command of a squadron sent to attack Spanish possessions in South America at the outset of the War of Jenkins' Ear.

Voyage around the world

After setting off later than planned, Anson's squadron encountered successive disasters. Two of his vessels, the fifth-rate  and the fourth-rate , failed to round Cape Horn and returned home. Meanwhile, the sixth-rate  was wrecked off the coast of Chile, where the crew subsequently mutinied. The lateness of the season forced him to round the Horn in very stormy weather, and the navigating instruments of the time did not allow for exact observations.

By the time Anson reached the Juan Fernández Islands in June 1741, only three of his six ships remained (HMS Centurion, the fourth-rate  and the sloop HMS Tryall), while the strength of his crews had fallen from 961 to 335. In the absence of any effective Spanish force on the coast, he was able to harass the enemy and to sack the small port city of Paita in Peru in November 1741. The steady decrease of his crews by scurvy and the worn-out state of his remaining consorts compelled him to collect all the remaining survivors in Centurion. He rested at the island of Tinian, and then made his way to Macao in November 1742.

After considerable difficulties with the Chinese, he sailed again with his one remaining vessel to cruise in search of one of the Manila galleons that conducted the trade between Mexico and the Chinese merchants in the Philippines, where he captured the Nuestra Señora de Covadonga with 1,313,843 pieces of eight on board, which he had encountered off Cape Espiritu Santo on 20 June 1743. The charts captured with the ship added many islands (and phantom islands) to the British knowledge of the Pacific, including the Anson Archipelago.

Anson took his prize back to Macao, sold her cargo to the Chinese, kept the specie, and sailed for England via the Cape of Good Hope. Passing by means of a thick fog a French fleet then patrolling the Channel, he reached England on 15 June 1744. The prize money earned from the capture of the galleon made Anson a rich man for life and bought him considerable political influence. He initially refused promotion to Rear-Admiral of the Blue however, out of anger that the admiralty refused to sanction a captain's commission he had given one of his officers.

Senior command and the Admiralty

Anson was elected Member of Parliament for Hedon in Yorkshire in 1744. He joined the Board of Admiralty led by the Duke of Bedford in December 1744. Promoted to Rear-Admiral of the White on 23 April 1745 and to vice-admiral of the blue in July 1745, he took command of the Western Squadron, with his flag in the third-rate , in July 1746.

Anson commanded the fleet that defeated the Marquis de la Jonquière at the First Battle of Cape Finisterre in May 1747 during the War of the Austrian Succession. His force captured the entire French squadron: four ships of the line, two frigates, and six merchantmen The treasure amounted to £300,000. He was elevated to the peerage as  Baron of Soberton, in the County of Southampton on 11 June 1747. In 1748, the memoir of Anson's circumnavigation—Voyage Round the World in the Years MDCCXL, I, II, III, IV—was published, having been edited from his notes and Richard Walter's journals by Benjamin Robins. It was a vast popular and commercial success. He was promoted to admiral of the blue on 12 May 1748 and became Vice-Admiral of Great Britain on 4 July 1749. He was advanced to Senior Naval Lord on the Admiralty Board in November 1749.

Anson became First Lord of the Admiralty in the Broad Bottom Ministry in June 1751 and continued to serve during the first Newcastle ministry. Among his reforms was the removal of corrupt defence contractors, improved medical care, submitting a revision of the Articles of War to Parliament so tightening discipline throughout the Navy, uniforms for commissioned officers, the transfer of the Marines from Army to Navy authority and a system for rating ships according to their number of guns.

Anson oversaw the Navy for much of the Seven Years' War, and established a permanent squadron at Devonport which could patrol the western approaches to both Britain and France. He was particularly concerned at the prospect of a French invasion of the British Isles which led him to keep a large force in the English Channel. In 1756 he was criticised for not sending enough ships with Admiral Byng to relieve Minorca because he wanted to protect Britain from a threatened invasion, only to see Byng fail to save Minorca while no invasion attempt materialised. He left the Admiralty when the Newcastle ministry fell in November 1756 and then served again as First Lord when the Pitt–Newcastle ministry was created in June 1757.

In July 1758, after Edward Hawke had decided to strike his flag and return to port over a misunderstanding at which he took offence, Anson hoisted his own flag in the first-rate  and took over command of the Western Squadron again. Anson oversaw Britain's naval response to a more serious French invasion attempt in 1759. He instituted a close blockade of the French coast, which proved crippling to the French economy and ensured no invasion fleet could slip out undetected. The British victories at the Battle of Lagos in August 1759 and the Battle of Quiberon Bay in November 1759 ended any realistic chance of a major invasion of the British Isles.

As well as securing home defence, Anson co-ordinated with William Pitt a series of British attacks on French colonies around the globe. By 1760 the British had captured Canada, Senegal and Guadeloupe from the French, and followed it up by capturing Belle Île and Dominica in 1761. In 1762 the entry of Spain into the war offered further chances for British expeditions. Anson was the architect of a plan to seize Manila in the Philippines and, using the idea and plans of Admiral Sir Charles Knowles to capture Havana. Anson had been concerned that the combined strength of the French and Spanish navies would overpower Britain, but he still threw himself into the task of directing these expeditions. The British also captured Martinique and Grenada in the French West Indies. Anson was promoted to Admiral of the Fleet on 30 July 1761. His last service was to convey Queen Charlotte to England.

He died at Moor Park in Hertfordshire on 6 June 1762 and was buried at St Michael and All Angels Church in Colwich, Staffordshire. Places named after him include Anson County, North Carolina and Anson, Maine. Eight warships of the Royal Navy have also been named after him.

Family
In April 1748, Anson married Lady Elizabeth Yorke, daughter of Philip Yorke, 1st Earl of Hardwicke; they had no children.

See also
 Warships named after Lord Anson

References

Sources
 

Attribution

Further reading

External links

 
Anson's Voyage Round the World by Richard Walter, 1901, from Project Gutenberg

|-

|-

|-

1697 births
1762 deaths
Barons in the Peerage of Great Britain
Peers of Great Britain created by George II
Circumnavigators of the globe
Lords of the Admiralty
Members of the Privy Council of Great Britain
Members of the Parliament of Great Britain for English constituencies
British MPs 1741–1747
Royal Navy admirals of the fleet
Fellows of the Royal Society
George
British military personnel of the War of the Quadruple Alliance
British military personnel of the War of the Spanish Succession
Royal Navy personnel of the War of the Austrian Succession
Royal Navy personnel of the Seven Years' War
Burials in Staffordshire
People from the Borough of Stafford